Alison Korn (born 22 November 1970 in Ottawa, Ontario) was a Canadian rower and Olympian.

Early life
Korn was raised in Nepean, Ontario. She attended Bells Corners Public School, D.A. Moodie Intermediate School and Bell High School

Korn was a member of Girl Guides of Canada as a child and attended Girl Guides Ontario's Camp Woolsey.

Career
Korn started rowing when she was 21. As a member of the Canadian national rowing team, she won silver and bronze medals at the 1996 and 2000 summer Olympics, respectively. She also has five world championship medals, including back-to-back golds in 1997 and 1998. Korn retired from the sport in 2000.

Korn has continued her involvement in Girl Guides of Canada as an adult volunteer.

Polar Trek
Korn was a member of an all-women's ski trek to the North Pole in 2001, which she chronicled for the Ottawa Citizen.

Education
Korn studied political science at McGill University, and earned her Masters in Journalism from Carleton University.

Honours
In 2016 Korn had a street named after her in Nepean, Ontario. She was inducted into the Ottawa Sport Hall of Fame in 2002.

References

External links
Ottawa Sport Hall of Fame profile

1970 births
Living people
Canadian female rowers
Rowers from Ottawa
Rowers at the 1996 Summer Olympics
Rowers at the 2000 Summer Olympics
Medalists at the 2000 Summer Olympics
Medalists at the 1996 Summer Olympics
Olympic silver medalists for Canada
Olympic bronze medalists for Canada
Olympic rowers of Canada
Olympic medalists in rowing
World Rowing Championships medalists for Canada
20th-century Canadian women